Cumulative gain  may refer to:
discounted cumulative gain (information retrieval).
cumulative elevation gain (running, cycling, and mountaineering)